The Cyaneidae are a family of true jellyfish. About 20 species are in this family, including the well-known lion's-mane jellyfish.

Species
The following species are recognized within the family Cyaneidae. Formerly, this family also included the genus Drymonema.
The Cyaneidae species do not possess any internal organs, ganglia, or any other nerve cells. They do, however, possess gap junctions between neurons which allow for complex reactive behavior and swimming actions.

 Genus Cyanea Péron & Lesueur, 1810
Cyanea annaskala von Lendenfeld, 1884
Cyanea buitendijki Stiasny, 1919
Cyanea capillata (Linnaeus, 1758)
Cyanea citrae (Kishinouye, 1910)
Cyanea ferruginea Eschscholtz, 1929
Cyanea lamarckii Péron & Lesueur, 1809
Cyanea nozakii Kishinouye, 1891
Cyanea postelsi Brandt, 1838
Cyanea purpurea Kishinouye, 1910
Cyanea rosea Quoy & Gaimard 1824
 Genus Desmonema L. Agassiz, 1862
Desmonema chierchianum Vanhöffen 1888
Desmonema comatum Larson 1986 
Desmonema gaudichaudi (Lesson 1832)
Desmonema glaciale Larson 1986
Desmonema scoresbyanna Gershwin & Zeidler 2008

References

 
Semaeostomeae
Cnidarian families